FreeRADIUS is a modular, high performance free RADIUS suite developed and distributed under the GNU General Public License, version 2, and is free for download and use. The FreeRADIUS Suite includes a RADIUS server, a BSD-licensed RADIUS client library, a PAM library, an Apache module, and numerous additional RADIUS related utilities and development libraries.

In most cases, the word "FreeRADIUS" refers to the free open-source RADIUS server from this suite.

FreeRADIUS is the most popular open source RADIUS server and the most widely deployed RADIUS server in the world. It supports all common authentication protocols, and the server comes with a PHP-based web user administration tool called dialupadmin. It is the basis for many commercial RADIUS products and services, such as embedded systems, RADIUS appliances that support Network Access Control, and WiMAX. It supplies the AAA needs of many Fortune-500 companies, telcos, and Tier 1 ISPs. It is also widely used in the academic community, including eduroam. The server is fast, feature-rich, modular, and scalable.

History 
FreeRADIUS was started in August 1999 by Alan DeKok and Miquel van Smoorenburg. Miquel had previously written the Cistron RADIUS server, which had gained widespread usage once the Livingston server was no longer being maintained. FreeRADIUS was started to create a new RADIUS server, using a modular design that would encourage more active community involvement.

As of November, 2014, the FreeRADIUS Project has three Core Team members: Alan DeKok (Project Leader), Arran Cudbard-Bell (Principal Architect), and Matthew Newton.

The latest major release is FreeRADIUS 3. FreeRADIUS 3 includes support for RADIUS over TLS, including RadSec, a completely rewritten rlm_ldap module, and hundreds of other minor consistency and usability enhancements. The latest mature version is maintained for stability rather than features.

The previous major release v2.2.x has entered the final phase of its lifecycle, and will now receive security fixes only 

A survey in 2006 showed that its user base totals 100 million people.

Features 
Modules included with the server core support LDAP, MySQL, PostgreSQL, Oracle, and many other databases. It supports all popular EAP authentication types, including PEAP and EAP-TTLS. More than 100 vendor dictionaries are included, ensuring compatibility with a wide range of NAS devices.

Version 2.0.0 added support for virtual hosting, IPv6, VMPS, and a new policy language that simplifies many complex configurations.

Administration tools 
 daloRADIUS: a web based management application aimed at managing hotspots and ISP deployments. With easy user management interface, pretty graphical reporting, accounting, also billing engine and integrates with GoogleMaps for geo-locating.
 phpRADmin: a tool written in PHP intended to handle the administration and provisioning of FreeRADIUS over the Web with MySQL as backend.
 Dialup Admin: a powerful web interface written in PHP comes with FreeRADIUS to administer radius users. Dialup Admin supports users either in SQL (MySQL or PostgreSQL are supported) or in LDAP. No longer under active development.
 ezRadius: web-based management app. The main aim is to provide radius server or hotspot administrator a simple web-based management application. FreeRADIUS must be configured to use MySQL as backend.
 RADIUSdesk:RADIUSdesk has been developed since 2012 as tool to manage wireless Internet and has been under active development ever since.

See also 
 Diameter protocol: the proposed replacement for RADIUS

Notes

External links 
 
 FreeRADIUS wiki

Computer security software